Sergei Ivanovich Alyapkin (born 7 June 1972 in Kamensk-Uralsky) is a Russian professional football coach and a former player.

Alyapkin played in the Russian Premier League with FC Uralmash Yekaterinburg.

External links
  Career profile at Footballfacts
 

1972 births
Living people
Russian footballers
Russian Premier League players
FC Ural Yekaterinburg players
People from Kamensk-Uralsky
Association football goalkeepers
Sportspeople from Sverdlovsk Oblast